Doc Walker is a country music group from Westbourne, Manitoba, Canada.  They have won Canadian Country Music Awards and had radio hits with the songs "I Am Ready" and "The Show is Free" from the 2003 album Everyone Aboard. In 2001 they released the album Curve.  Both albums were for Universal Music Group.

Doc Walker is signed to Open Road Recordings and managed by RGK Entertainment Group.

"Coming Home" was released to radio in June 2009, as the lead single from the group's sixth studio album, Go, released in early September 2009.

"Country Girl" was released to radio in July 2011, as the lead single from the group's seventh studio album, 16 & 1, released August 29 physically and August 30, 2011 digitally.

Discography

Studio albums

Compilation albums

Extended plays

Singles

1990s and 2000s

2010s and 2020s

As a featured artist

Music videos

Awards and nominations

Notes

References

External links
Doc Walker Official Site

Canadian country music groups
Juno Award for Country Album of the Year winners
Open Road Recordings artists
Canadian Country Music Association Fans' Choice Award winners
Canadian Country Music Association Group or Duo of the Year winners
Canadian Country Music Association Single of the Year winners
Musical groups from Manitoba
Canadian Country Music Association Album of the Year winners